The Church of Our Lady a church in Kortedala in Gothenburg in Sweden. Earlier belonging to the Kortdeala Parish of the Church of Sweden, it was inaugurated on 19 March 1972. In 2007, the Church of Sweden stopped using it and in 2008 it was sold to the Serbian Orthodox Parish.

References

External links

Serbian Orthodox church buildings in Sweden
Churches in Gothenburg
Churches completed in 1972